Hurrah, originally Huzzah, is an exclamation.

Hurrah may refer to:

Hurrah, Florida, also known as Picnic, a small town in Florida, U.S.
Hurrah!, British jangle pop band
Hurrah (nightclub), a former New York City nightclub
Hurrah Pass, a mountain pass in Utah, U.S.
Hurrah (film), a 1998 Australian film

See also

Hip Hip Hurray (disambiguation)
The Last Hurrah (disambiguation)
Hooah, a U.S. Army battle cry
Hooyah, a U.S. Navy battle cry
Oorah (Marines), a U.S. Marine Corps battle cry